Theodore Hauman (Ghent, 3 July 1808 - Brussels, 21 August 1878) also written Theodor Haumann, was a Belgian violinist and teacher.

Biography 
Theodore Hauman was a prominent Belgian violinist born in a Jewish family in Ghent. He studied violin with Joseph François Snel of the Grand théâtre of Brussels. During his training, he alternated for several periods the study of the violin, with university studies. At the behest of his parents he studied at the University of Leuven but he left it after two years to devote himself to the violin, but ultimately graduated in Law in 1830.

Since 1827, he was successful soloist in performances in Paris and devoted himself entirely to music, practicing violin for up to ten hours a day. He made a new appearance in Paris in 1832 with great success. The following year Hauman met Niccolò Paganini who took a friendly interest in him so much that he became his protégé. Hauman took part in Berlioz's memorable concert on December 22, 1833. It was on that occasion that Paganini, who had come mainly to encourage his "protégé", heard the "Symphonie fantastique" op. 14 directed by Narcisse Girard and at the end of the concert she knelt in front of Berlioz as a sign of admiration.
After the successes in Paris, he performed as a violinist in numerous concerts in France and conducted numerous tours in Europe in the following years. Hauman was elected in 1842 as a member of the Royal Academy of Music in Stockholm. Hauman is mentioned several times in the diaries of Robert Schumann and Clara Wieck. In Paris between January and February 1843, Camillo Sivori, Paganini's famous pupil, and Hauman challenged each other in a public performance, a sort of 'skill contest', of Paganini's Venice Carnival. As Berlioz informs us, in 1844 Hauman after a triumphal tour in Russia decided to open a music school in Paris to devote himself to teaching.

Critical reception 
The testimonies of contemporaries on Hauman's playing do not seem to have always been favorable. Despite an excellent technique, it seems that he had a strong inclination to mannerism, "Fantasias with Airs with variations". The German poet Heinrich Heine was particularly lashing in his critique of Hauman, classifying him as the prototype of the "virtuoso of the void". For Heine, Hauman tended to move away from the composer's language by adding "embellishments" and other bright flourishes that were irrelevant to the original text.

Composition 
 Albert Sowinski-Theodore Hauman, Duo brillant sur la prière d'Otello, for violin and piano op. 13, Paris, Launer, sa [c. 1829]; dedicated to Madame Malibran

Bibliography 
François-Joseph Fétis, voice Hauman (Théodore), in Biographie universelle des musiciens, tome quatrième, deuxième édition, Paris, Firmin Didot, 1862, pp. 244–245
Baron de Bazancourt (tr. JA Munkelt), Theodore Haumann the Belgian violinist, in "The Musical Standard", Vol. 15, Fasc. 741, (12 Oct. 1878), p. 231

References

External links 
François-Joseph Fétis, Biographie universelle des musiciens (Second edition), volume 4, 1862, pp. 244-245

Belgian classical violinists
Jewish classical violinists
1808 births
1878 deaths